First Narrows may refer to:
 First Narrows (Strait of Magellan) - in Spanish "Primera Angostura", the first narrows in the Strait of Magellan, when proceeding east to west.
 First Narrows (Vancouver), Vancouver's first narrows protects the main harbour, east of the city the second narrows opens into several long bays - see DGS Mastodon